Morphsuits is a company in Edinburgh, Scotland that distributes branded spandex costumes, based on the existing skin-tight garments, which cover the entire body. The company offers over 80 different designs. The company was founded by brothers Ali and Fraser Smeaton, and their flatmate Gregor Lawson.

It later added children's sizes, called MorphKids, and female-targeted accessories.

Morphsuits is a division of AFG Media, which includes menswear line Foul Fashion and golf wear line Royal & Awesome.

History

According to the founders' account, they were inspired to create the company after a one-color costume party in Dublin, to which a friend of the founders was wearing a zentai bodysuit. At the event, the friend became somewhat of a celebrity, being bought drinks and posing for hundreds of pictures. After researching the fancy dress market, Smeaton, Smeaton, and Lawson invested £1,000 each. The original corporate website cost $300.

Beginning in May 2009, shipping of the first batch of 200 costumes was done from their flat. Balancing their day jobs and the company meant "a lot of 2 a.m. finishes" while running their business. As of August 2011, outsourcing had raised their indirect staffing to 200. As of late 2012, suits were manufactured in Shanghai.

The company received a boost to its sales when the 2009 British Lions tour of South Africa, at which eight fans wore red Morphsuits, was covered extensively by sports journalists and photographers.

Many early mainstream appearances of similar suits in North America were not their brand: The Green Men, two fans of the Vancouver Canucks NHL team, used Super Fan Suits, as do hip-hop group The Body Poets, while appearances on It's Always Sunny in Philadelphia predate either brand's founding.

As of August 2011, there were 40 varieties, and 50 as of September 2011. MorphKids, a child's-sized line, was launched in the United States before any other market. The company sold 35,000 units in 48 hours. Around Halloween 2012, a psychologist noted increased confidence and social skills in children wearing the outfits, and an "overall calming effect" in children with autism. As of April 2013, the company stated it expected MorphKids to outstrip the parent brand four-fold. In October 2012, Morphsuits launched their first licensed design, featuring Saban's Mighty Morphin' Power Rangers; the company claims the costumes were the "best-selling item" in their history. With their investment from BFG, they hoped to pursue the Spider-Man license, deeming licenses "fundamental to the business's future success." In 2013 Morphsuits added "Animal Planet" Morphsuits, including a Vampire Bat with fabric wings connected to the arms, and a Cobra with a neck frill. Other products include the head-only lycra Morphmask and Megamorph, an inflated suit with lycra over the head, hands, and feet.

Corporate 
As of May 2011, it claimed to be the world's largest fancy dress brand.

As of 2011, Gregor Lawson had worked in brand management for eight years. Trained with "FMCG marketing" (fast-moving consumer goods) at Gillette and later Procter & Gamble, he led marketing on Pantene, Pringles, and Gillette. He left P&G in July 2010. Lawson is brother of rugby union player Rory Lawson, son of rugby union player Alan Lawson, and grandson of rugby union commentator Bill McLaren.

In their first year, the company sold 20,000 costumes, bringing in £1.2 million. Between January and October 2010, the company shipped 10,000 units to Canada.  In the 2010-2011 financial year, they did £4.5m in sales. They expect £10.5m in revenue in the 2011-2012 fiscal year. In October 2010, Morphsuits gave 2011 estimates of £6 million; by July 2011, they told the BBC of a year-end estimate of £10 million. The company sold an initial order of 100,000 Morphsuits to retail chain Party City. The company expect sales of £309,980 in October 2012.

As of 2011, the partners had no direct employees, with all roles being outsourced. As of summer 2011, that included a Chinese manufacturer, warehouses in the United States, United Kingdom, and Australia, and a customer contact centre in Fife. In 2012, Mishal Verjee was added as Marketing Director. One September 2012 article cited AFG in employing 21 staff at five sites worldwide, but did not clarify if they were direct or outsourced.

The founding entrepreneurs have spoken publicly about their dislike for UK tax rules, which make "company owners pay 40 percent on any sum taken out in dividends above £35,000, against only 10 percent if they were to sell their business." They have suggested incentives to expand operations would be more beneficial than "inducements" to sell their company. The company received overtures from private equity investors in 2011, since their Ernst & Young Entrepreneur of the Year Awards nomination in Scotland, that year; they have suggested the business has kept them too busy to consider any of the offers.

In February 2012, the company (as AFG Media) received a £600,000 loan from Barclays Corporate.

In July 2012, Business Growth Fund invested £4.2 million in AFG, the size of its stake was unannounced, but their firm generally takes between 10% and 40% of the share capital. The investment was meant to help product development, the MorphKids line, and develop supply chain as the company looks to expand in the US, Europe, Mexico, Russia, Japan and China. Ralph Kugler was introduced as chairman of the company's board, and Duncan Macrae also added to the board.

They have a low rate of product return, at just 1%, which they credit to the limited SKU (stock-keeping unit), allowing them to ensure consistent quality of the product.

At least some products are sourced through Alibaba.

Marketing

Gregor Lawson has spoken at seminars about technology and business, about their use of Facebook and e-commerce. Much of their marketing strategy is based on fans' ideas, a process Fraser Smeaton calls "scrum marketing"; suit designs, potential sales outlets, and competitions have all been dictated by its followers.

There are regional sales differences: in the United Kingdom, the product is considered year-round, with a small jump in sales near Halloween. In the United States, sales are much more highly focused at the Halloween season. The company runs 13 localized e-commerce websites.

Black is the company's most popular colour. The majority of Morphsuits' customers are men, but the company hopes that a new morphsuit model with a built-on tutu will expand female sales.

The brand has tried to distance itself from the term zentai, and the concept of fetish usage. Being one of the earliest brands to court a general market, the terms "Morphsuits" and "morphs" are regularly applied to events related to any sort of zentai suit. Their term risks becoming a genericized trademark in the process; one New Zealand newspaper refers to a competing brand, Jaskins, as a "one of the main online morphsuit brands."

For a while, the website's FAQ page listed the suits as legal globally. This response either ignored or overlooked Anti-mask laws, such as those in France.

References

External links

 

One-piece suits
Clothing companies of Scotland
Clothing brands
Clothing companies established in 2009
Clothing companies of the United Kingdom
2009 establishments in Scotland

de:Zentai#Morphsuits